Browallia speciosa is a blue-violet tender perennial usually grown as an annual flowering plant also called the amethyst flower or bush violet. It is much used as a garden ornamental.

Use in Colombian folk medicine
The Ingano of Mocoa in the Colombian department of Putumayo chew the leaves of Browallia speciosa and pack the resultant material around carious molars to alleviate the pain.

References

External links
Bush Violet Fact Sheet
Browallia Speciosa
Perennial Plants

Cestroideae
Perennial plants